Barbara Hale (April 18, 1922 – January 26, 2017) was an American actress who portrayed legal secretary Della Street in the dramatic television series Perry Mason (1957–1966), earning her a 1959 Emmy Award for Outstanding Supporting Actress in a Drama Series. She reprised the role in 30 Perry Mason made-for-television movies (1985–1995).

Early life
Barbara Hale was born in DeKalb, Illinois, to Wilma (née Colvin) and Luther Ezra Hale, a landscape gardener. She had one sister, Juanita, for whom Hale's younger daughter was named. The family was of Scotch-Irish ancestry. In 1940, Hale was a member of the final graduating class from Rockford High School in Rockford, Illinois, then attended the Chicago Academy of Fine Arts, planning to be an artist. Her performing career began in Chicago, when she started modeling to pay for her education.

Career

Film

Hale moved to Hollywood in 1943, and under contract to RKO Radio Pictures, made her first screen appearance (uncredited) in Gildersleeve's Bad Day. She continued to make small uncredited appearances in films, until her first credited role alongside Frank Sinatra in Higher and Higher (1943) (even singing with him in the film). Hale had leading roles in movies including West of the Pecos (1945) with Robert Mitchum in his second film as the leading man, Lady Luck (1946) — opposite Robert Young in what she described as her first "full stardom" and "her fifth A picture" —  and The Window (1949). She received excellent notices for her co-starring performance opposite Larry Parks in the musical biography Jolson Sings Again (1949). She and Parks were teamed for subsequent films.

Her roles in 1950s films such as the adventure Lorna Doone (1951); the comedy The Jackpot (with James Stewart) (also 1951); the drama A Lion Is in the Streets (1953) with James Cagney, and the Westerns Seminole (also 1953) and The Oklahoman (1957) continued Hale's run of successful movies during that decade. The latter film, co-starring Joel McCrea, would mark Hale's last leading role in a motion picture. She seldom appeared in film after this time, but was part of an all-star cast in the 1970 movie Airport, playing the wife of an airline pilot (played by Dean Martin). Hale's final appearance in a feature film was in the 1978 drama Big Wednesday as Mrs. Barlow, the mother of the character played by Hale's real-life son William Katt.

Television

Hale was considering retirement from acting when she accepted her best known role, as legal secretary Della Street in the television series Perry Mason, starring Raymond Burr as the titular character. The show ran for nine seasons from 1957 to 1966, with 271 episodes produced. The role won Hale a Primetime Emmy Award for Outstanding Supporting Actress in a Drama Series.

In 1985, Hale and Burr (by then the only surviving cast members from the original series) reprised their roles for the TV movie Perry Mason Returns. The film was such a ratings hit that a further 29 movies were produced until 1995. Hale continued her role as Della in the four telefilms produced after Burr's death in 1993, subtitled A Perry Mason Mystery (and starring Paul Sorvino as Anthony Caruso in the first film and Hal Holbrook as "Wild" Bill McKenzie in the remaining three). Hale is thus the only actor to feature in all 30 films.

Hale's son William Katt played detective Paul Drake, Jr., alongside Hale in nine of the Perry Mason TV movies from 1985 to 1988. Hale in turn guest-starred on Katt's series, The Greatest American Hero in which Katt played the title role, aka Ralph Hinkley; Hale played Hinkley's mother in the 1982 episode, "Who's Woo in America". She also played his mother in the 1978 movie Big Wednesday.

Hale guest-starred in "Murder Impromptu", a 1971 episode of Ironside, Burr's first post-Perry Mason series.

Her last on-screen appearance was a TV biographical documentary about Burr that aired in 2000.

Radio
Hale's activity in radio was limited; she appeared in one episode each of Voice of the Army (1947), Lux Radio Theatre (1950), and Proudly We Hail (syndicated), as well as five episodes of Family Theater (1950–1954).

Spokeswoman
Hale worked as a spokeswoman for Amana, makers of Radarange microwave ovens, memorably intoning, "If it doesn't say Amana, it's not a Radarange."

Private life and death
In 1945, during the filming of West of the Pecos, Hale met actor Bill Williams (birth name Herman August Wilhelm Katt). They were married on June 22, 1946. The couple had two daughters,  Jodi and Juanita, and a son, actor William Katt. 

Hale became a follower of the Baháʼí Faith.

Hale died at her home in Sherman Oaks, California, on January 26, 2017, at age 94 of complications from chronic obstructive pulmonary disease.

Accolades
Hale was recognized as a Star of Television (with a marker at 1628 Vine Street) on the Hollywood Walk of Fame on February 8, 1960. She won the Emmy Award for Best Supporting Actress (Continuing Character) in a Dramatic Series in 1959 and was nominated for the Emmy for Outstanding Performance in a Supporting Role by an Actor or Actress in a Series in 1961.

She was presented one of the Golden Boot Awards in 2001 for her contributions to western cinema.

Filmography

Films

Television

References

External links

 
 
 
 Barbara Hale Home Page
  Barbara Hale Annex
 Barbara Hale(Aveleyman)

1922 births
2017 deaths
People from DeKalb, Illinois
Actresses from Illinois
American radio actresses
American film actresses
American television actresses
Columbia Pictures contract players
Outstanding Performance by a Supporting Actress in a Drama Series Primetime Emmy Award winners
American people of Scotch-Irish descent
American Bahá'ís
20th-century Bahá'ís
21st-century Bahá'ís
20th-century American actresses
21st-century American women
Respiratory disease deaths in California
Deaths from chronic obstructive pulmonary disease